The First United Methodist Church of Drumright is a historic Methodist church in Drumright, Oklahoma. It was built in 1927 and added to the National Register of Historic Places in 1982.

Its NRHP nomination mentions it: is the only English Gothic style building in the Gushing oil field area. The stained glass windows are unique because of the leaded diamond pane construction and the designs of the stained glass windows along the north and south sides of the sanctuary. There are five distinct pairs of window patterns, each matching on the north and south walls. The window patterns have no narrative content which is unusual for a religious structure of this scale. These ornate features were an attempt at sophistication for a small oil boom town in Oklahoma.

References

Methodist churches in Oklahoma
Churches on the National Register of Historic Places in Oklahoma
Gothic Revival church buildings in Oklahoma
Churches completed in 1927
Buildings and structures in Creek County, Oklahoma
National Register of Historic Places in Creek County, Oklahoma